The Desperate Hours is a 1967 TV film. It was an adaptation of the 1954 novel The Desperate Hours.

Cast
George Segal as Glenn Griffin
Arthur Hill as Dan Hilliard
Michael Conrad as Sam Robish
Mart Hulswit as Graham Jarvis		
Michael Kearney as Ralphie Hilliard
Yvette Mimieux as Cindy Hilliard
Barry Primus as Hank Griffin
Dolph Sweet as Jesse Bard
Ralph Waite as Lt. Fredericks
Teresa Wright as Eleanor Hilliard

Production
The film was originally going to star George Segal and Robert Stack. Stack then read the script, was unhappy his role – that of the father – had been changed into a "psychopathic heavy" and pulled out, saying it "wasn't the same story" as the novel and play.

Reception
One reviewer thought the leads were miscast.

References

External links

1967 television films
1967 films
1960s thriller films
American thriller television films
Films with screenplays by Clive Exton
1960s English-language films
Films directed by Ted Kotcheff
1960s American films